Dobel, or Kobro’or, is one of the Aru languages, spoken by inhabitants of the Aru Islands Regency. It is close to Kola.

References

Further reading
 

Aru languages
Languages of Indonesia